Ziegel (lit. "brick") is a German language  surname. Notable people with the name include:
 Erich Ziegel (1876–1950), German theatre director and actor
 Felix Ziegel (1920–1988), Soviet researcher
 Tyler Ziegel (1982–2012), United States Marine Corps sergeant
 Vic Ziegel (1937–2010), American sports writer, columnist, and editor 

German-language surnames
Occupational surnames